Dahyabhai V. Patel (born 10 March 1945 - 3 May 2021) was a member of the 14th Lok Sabha and 15th Lok Sabha of India. He represented the Daman and Diu constituency and is a member of the Indian National Congress (INC) political party.

Personal life
He was married to Chanchal Ben and had 2 sons and 1 daughter.

External links
 Official biographical sketch in Parliament of India website

1945 births
Living people
Indian National Congress politicians
India MPs 2004–2009
People from Daman and Diu
Lok Sabha members from Daman and Diu
Daman and Diu politicians
India MPs 1999–2004